Parque del Reencuentro is a private cemetery in Uruguay. 

It is located at Canelones Department, 21 km north of downtown Montevideo, on the Ruta 5, near Las Piedras.

History
The cemetery was established in 1993; it is operated by the same company as Parque del Recuerdo.

References

External links
 Parque del Reencuentro
 

Cemeteries in Canelones Department
1993 establishments in Uruguay